Perstechnique is the fourth studio album by the Finnish industrial metal band Turmion Kätilöt, released on 23 February 2011. Before the album, the single "IHMISIXSIXSIX" was released digitally.

Track listing

References

Turmion Kätilöt albums
2011 albums